The following is a list of known abandoned communities in the Northwest Territories, Canada. Many of these were "one-resource" towns and were abandoned following the depletion of the resources (usually minerals).

Abandoned communities 
 Cameron Bay
 Camp Canol
 Discovery
 Fort Confidence
 Old Fort Providence
 Pine Point
 Port Radium
 Rayrock
 Rocher River
 Tungsten

See also
List of communities in the Northwest Territories
Census divisions of the Northwest Territories

Northwest Territories